This is a list of women artists who were born in Romania or whose artworks are closely associated with that country.

A
Nina Arbore (1889–1942), painter, illustrator

B
Zoe Băicoianu (1910–1987), sculptor, ceramist
Silvia Barbescu (born 1961), multidisciplinary artist
Elena Alexandrina Bednarik (1883–1939), painter and teacher
Geta Brătescu (1926–2018), visual artist

C
 Silvia Cambir (1924–2007), expressionist painter, illustrator
 Ioana Ciolacu (born 1982), fashion designer
 Lena Constante (1909–2005), painter, writer
 Margaret Cossaceanu or Margaret Cossaceanu-Lavrillier (1893–1980), sculptor
 Cecilia Cuțescu-Storck (1879–1969), influential painter, sculptor and feminist

D
Margarete Depner (1885–1970), sculptor, painter, illustrator
Felicia Donceanu (1931–2022), painter, sculptor, composer
Natalia Dumitresco (1915–1997), French-Romanian abstract painter

E
Céline Emilian (1898–1983), sculptor

L
Myra Landau (1926–2018), abstract painter

M
Ana Maria Micu (born 1979), visual artist

N
Georgeta Năpăruș (1930–1997), modernist painter
Alexandra Nechita (born 1985), cubist painter, philanthropist
Margareta Niculescu (1926–2018), painter, puppeteer, educator

P
Lili Pancu (1908–2006), painter
Milița Petrașcu (1892–1976), painter, sculptor
Laura Poantă (born 1971), physician, writer, painter
Elena Popea (1879–1941), painter
Florica Prevenda (born 1959), painter

R
Silvia Radu (born 1935), sculptor, potter, painter
Alma Redlinger (1924–2017), painter, illustrator
Maria Rusescu (born 1936), painter

S
Irina Schrotter (born 1965), fashion designer
Hedda Sterne (1910–2011), painter

T
Laura Taler (born 1969), performance artist
Maria Tănase (1913–1963), singer and actress

U

 Andra Ursuța (born 1979), sculptor

Z
Marian Zidaru (born 1956), sculptor and painter

-
Romanian
Artists
Artists, women